Mütiilation was a French black metal project, traditionally known as a group, but later a solo project that consisted solely of its founder William "Meyhna'ch" Roussel who maintained activity under the name until its closing in 2017. Mütiilation has released six full-length albums and appeared on several EPs and compilations.

History

The beginning and the Black Legions 
Mütiilation was founded in 1991 by Meyhna'ch, drummer Dark Wizard of Silence and bassist David. They recorded a few demos as a trio until 1993, when David left due to Mütiilation becoming the first band of the Black Legions. At this time, Mütiilation released an EP to honor the circle titled Hail Satanas We Are The Black Legions.

Shortly after, Dark Wizzard of Silence was replaced by Krissagrazabeth, who recorded with the band up to Vampires of Black Imperial Blood. Once again, he left due to disagreements with the Black Legions. On the contrary, Mørdrëd, who played bass, was properly admitted into the circle; this line-up was featured in The Black Plague – First Chapter (And Maybe Last One).

The reincarnation 
In 1999 Drakkar Productions released a compilation of unreleased material, Remains of a Ruined, Dead, Cursed Soul. The album stated that Meyhna'ch was "dead" due to disgust with the black metal scene. However, in 2001, Mütiilation came back with the release of Black Millenium (Grimly Reborn), with another scathing message against the scene. At this point the band had become a solo project, and Meyhna'ch still used the Black Legions' emblem on some releases.

Mütiilation then followed with two performances with acts such as Impiety, Abigail, Decayed, Tsjuder, Watain and Judas Iscariot. During this time Noktu, Fureiss and Astrelya from Celestia were used as live members, filling in for guitars and drums. TND played bass at the gig in Marseille, yet could not perform in Germendorf.

Following three more studio albums and a split with Satanic Warmaster and Drowning the Light, Meyhna'ch quietly deactivated Mütiilation. Despite a one-off performance at the 2015 edition of Hellfest, Meyhna'ch has carried on with new music under his own alias, and maintains that Mütiilation is "dead".

Members

Current 
Meyhna'ch – bass, guitar, drum programming, vocals (1991–1996, 2000–2009, 2009–2017)

Former 
Dark Wizard Of Silence – drums (1992–1994)
David – bass (1992–1994)
Krissagrazabeth – drums (1994)
Mørdrëd – bass (1995)
TND – bass (2001)
Andy Julia – drums (2001)
Cyril Mendre – guitar (2001)
Fureiss Frank – guitar (2001)
Azk.6 – drums (2015–2017)
Reverend Prick – bass (2015–2017)
Patrice Duthoo – guitar (2015–2017)

Discography

Albums 
 Vampires of Black Imperial Blood (1995)
 Remains of a Ruined, Dead, Cursed Soul (1999)
 Black Millenium (Grimly Reborn) (2001)
 Majestas Leprosus (2003)
 Rattenkönig (2005)
 Sorrow Galaxies (2007)

Demos 
 Rehearsal 1992 (1992)
 Rites through the Twilight of Hell (1992)
 Ceremony of the Black Cult (1993)
 Evil – The Gestalt of Abomination (1993)
 Cursed (Rehearsal 1994) (1994)
 Satanist Styrken (1994)
 Black Imperial Blood (Travel) (1994)
 Rehearsal 2001 (2001)
 Destroy Your Life for Satan (2001)

EPs, splits and compilations 
 Hail Satanas We Are The Black Legions (1994)
 Promo (1995)
 New False Prophet (2000)
 Split with Deathspell Omega (2002)
 1992–2002: Ten Years of Depressive Destruction (2003)
 From the Entrails to the Dirt (Part II) (2005)
 Split With Drowning The Light and Satanic Warmaster (2007)
 ''Black as Lead & Death (EP, 2012)

See also 
Les Légions Noires
Heavy metal umlaut

References

External links 
 Official website, archived copy found at Internet Archive

French black metal musical groups
Les Légions Noires bands
Musical groups established in 1991
Musical groups disestablished in 1996
Musical groups reestablished in 2000
Musical groups disestablished in 2009
Musical groups reestablished in 2014
Musical groups disestablished in 2017
1991 establishments in France
Musical groups from Occitania (administrative region)